Wiko is a French company, fully owned subsidiary of Chinese mobile phone manufacturer Tinno Mobile.

History
Wiko was established in February 2011 by French businessman Laurent Dahan. Its head office, design and marketing teams are based in Marseille, France.

Wiko shipped 2.6 million devices overall in 2013, mostly dual-SIM Android smartphones. That year, it sold 1.7 million smartphones in France, i.e. 7 % of the French market and it was the country's second largest selling smartphone firm after Samsung.

In 2014 Wiko entered the British market.

In 2018 Wiko was present in more than 30 countries in: Europe, Asia, the Middle East and Africa and had around 30 million users, twice the number of two years earlier.

Privacy data collection 
In November 2017, it is revealed that pre-installed application within phones from Wiko (a Tinno Mobile subsidiary) would transmit technical data monthly to Tinno without customer consent. The company confirmed the existence of such information collection system and said updated version of those applications will no longer collect geographical information of devices.

Remote shut down
A vulnerability was identified that allows anyone to remotely shut down a phone using a "=" text message, the flaw could be in hardware, rather than software.

See also
BQ (company)

References

French companies established in 2011
Mobile phone manufacturers
Electronics companies of France
Telecommunication equipment companies of China
Companies based in Marseille
French brands
French subsidiaries of foreign companies
2017 mergers and acquisitions